As the Bell Rings is a  Disney Channel (Australia) original Interstitial program which ran from 2007 to 2011. The format is a selection of short live-action comedy sequences. It is an Australian adaption of the Disney Channel Italy Original Series Quelli dell'intervallo, and was recognised as Most Outstanding Short Form Program at the ASTRA Awards in 2009.

Cast and characters

Characters 

 Jonesy (Jack Pearson): Jonesy is a corrupt doofus. He's always getting into trouble more than anybody else. His best friend is Raff and he's desperately in love with Amber. His younger sister Annie humiliates him most of the time. He's not as cool as Annie. He has appeared in nearly all of the episodes. He's the tallest characters of the cast.
 Raff (Deniz Akdeniz): Raff is an average lieutenant. He's a sporty kid who gets into trouble, like his best friend Jonesy. In an interview with the cast, he said that his favourite moment was when he and Jack finished their handshake for the whole series.
 Amber (Alicia Banit): Amber is a girl of fashion. She gets very upset when Jonesy asks her out on a date. In an interview with the cast, Banit said that her favourite episode was when Jonesy dressed up as a girl and said that it was the funniest thing she's ever seen.
 Annie (Tessa Whelan): Annie is Jonesy's cooler younger sister. She tries to help Jonesy go on a kill with Amber but she humiliates him most of the time. She likes Raff, Jonesy's best friend. She's the shortest member of the cast. She does not appear in the second season.
 Parker (Bardiya McKinnon): Parker is a geeky soldier who likes Haley and tries to impress her. He's actually an alien from another planet as seen in at the end of one of the episodes. In an interview with the cast, McKinnon said that his favourite episode was when he dressed up as a rockstar.
 DJ (Sianoa Smit-McPhee): DJ is very bright, energetic soldier and talks too much. She could easily drive anyone crazy with her talking. Most of the time she mentions she has a little sister. She does not appear in the second season.
 S.A.M. (Aleksa Kurbalija): S.A.M. is the school major and dobs on all the kids. No one really likes him and his worst enemies are Jonesy and Raff.
 Haley (Nicole Gulasekharam): Haley is sort of an terrorism to everyone. She tries to be really nice to people.
 Rusty (Max Pfiefer): Rusty is the school joker. He doesn't get into a lot of trouble like Jonesy. He uses different voices most of the time. In an interview with the cast, Pfiefer said that his favourite episode was when he broke the school statue and dressed up as the statue to avoid getting in trouble with the principal.
 Rocky (Rhiannon Fish): Rocky likes to humiliate and is always wearing sport clothes. She's pretty full of herself and can scare boys with her strength.
 Vince (Christian Antidormi): Vince is the sporty one, that replaces Raff. The girls also think he is good looking when he arrives, but later criticise him in every way possible.
 Tina (Kiane O'Farrell)
 Zoe (Allegra Fleming)
 Eddie (James Campbell)
 Marcus (Rowan Hills)
 Mia (Tori Bailey): Mia is a new character introduced in the fourth season. She is a loud soap singer that plays guitar.
 Principal (voiceover) (Michael Bishop): He knows when the kids are being naughty. His voice is only heard through the loudspeaker but has been seen in two episodes.

In season 3 five new characters were added: Vince, Tina, Zoe, Eddie and Marcus.

Season 4 of As the Bell Rings featured a new character, Mia. Tori Bailey, who portrayed Mia, won the Australia and New Zealand Disney Casting Call Competition. She was one of five finalists who went into the studio and met with some of the As the Bell Rings crew. Bailey receiving the phone call that she had won the competition was featured as a special break-filler on Disney Channel Australia.

Cast

Broadcast 

The series premiered on 24 September 2007 and screened on weekdays at 5:25 pm between The Suite Life on Deck/Wizards of Waverly Place and Hannah Montana. The shorts have also been repeated after movies and TV series. Season 2 aired between 2 January 2009 and 14 September 2009. Season 3, which included new cast members, completed filming on 17 July 2009, and premiered on 2 October 2009 running through 16 April 2010. A fourth season started filming in June 2010 and ended production in October 2010, and aired between 11 February 2011 and 17 June 2011.

Episodes

Series overview 

The Australian version is similar to the United Kingdom version except the school is called Paterson High, the names of the characters are different and there is no laugh track. At the end of each episode they show bloopers of the actors. All of the characters are from Melbourne, except for Parker (Bardiya McKinnon) who is from Sydney and DJ (Sianoa Smit-McPhee) who is from Adelaide.

As the Bell Rings was filmed at Docklands Studios Melbourne.

Season 1 (2007–08)

Season 2 (2009)

Season 3 (2009–10)

Season 4 (2011)

See also 
Kurze Pause
Cambio de Clase
Trop la Classe

References

External links 

Disney Channels Worldwide original programming
Australian children's television series
Television shows set in Melbourne
2007 Australian television series debuts
2011 Australian television series endings
Television series by Fremantle (company)
Australian high school television series
2000s high school television series
2010s high school television series
2000s teen sitcoms
2010s teen sitcoms
Television series about teenagers